Louis Wilhelm Gertenrich (May 4, 1875 – October 20, 1933) was a professional baseball player. He played parts of two seasons in Major League Baseball as an outfielder for the Milwaukee Brewers and Pittsburgh Pirates.

References

External links

Major League Baseball outfielders
Milwaukee Brewers (1901) players
Pittsburgh Pirates players
Springfield Babes (baseball) players
Chicago Green Sox players
Chicago Keeleys players
1875 births
1933 deaths
Baseball players from Chicago
Chicago Garden Citys players